Rictus is a genus of Bikosea, a small group of unicellular flagellates, included among the heterokonts.

References

External links
 

Bikosea
Heterokont genera
Monotypic SAR supergroup genera